Nikolay Mikhaylovich Przhevalsky (or Prjevalsky;  – ) was a Russian geographer of  Polish descent (he was born in a Polish noble family), and a renowned explorer of Central and East Asia.

Although he never reached his ultimate goal, the holy city of Lhasa in Tibet, he traveled through regions then unknown to the West, such as northern Tibet (modern Tibet Autonomous Region), Amdo (now Qinghai) and Dzungaria (now northern Xinjiang). He contributed substantially to European knowledge of Central Asian geography.

He also described several species previously unknown to European science: Przewalski's horse, Przewalski's gazelle, and the wild Bactrian camel, all of which are now endangered.

He was a mentor of his follower Pyotr Kozlov.

Biography
Przhevalsky was born in Kimborovo, in the Smolensky Uyezd of the Smolensk Governorate of the Russian Empire in the Polish noble family.  He studied there and at the military academy in St. Petersburg. In 1864, he became a geography teacher at the military school in Warsaw.

In 1867, Przhevalsky successfully petitioned the Russian Geographical Society to be dispatched to Irkutsk, in central Siberia. His intention was to explore the basin of the Ussuri River, a major tributary of the Amur on the Russian–Chinese frontier. This was his first important expedition. It lasted two years, after which Przhevalsky published a diary of the expedition under the title, Travels in the Ussuri Region, 1867–69.

His most well-known follower and student was Pyotr Kozlov, who discovered the ruins of the Tangut city Khara-Khoto in the Ejin Banner of Alxa League in western Inner Mongolia near Juyan Lake Basin.

Further expeditions 
In the following years he made four journeys to Central Asia:

 1870–1873 from Kyakhta he crossed the Gobi Desert to Beijing then explored the upper Yangtze, and in 1872 crossed into Tibet. Przehevalsky was awarded the Constantine Medal by the Imperial Geographical Society, promoted to lieutenant-general, appointed to the Tsar's General Staff, and received the Order of St. Vladimir, 4th Class.

During his expedition, the Dungan Revolt (1862–77) was raging in China. The journey provided the General Staff with important intelligence on a Muslim uprising in the kingdom of Yaqub Beg in western China, and his lecture to the Russian Imperial Geographical Society was received with "thunderous applause" from an overflow audience. The Russian newspaper Golos Prikazchika called the journey "one of the most daring of our time".
 1876–1877 traveling through East Turkestan through the Tian Shan, he visited what he believed to be Qinghai Lake, which had reportedly not been visited by any European since Marco Polo. The expedition consisted of ten men, twenty-four camels, four horses, three tonnes of baggage and a budget of 25,000 rubles, but the expedition was beset by disease and poor quality camels. In September 1877, the caravan was refurbished with better camels and horses, 72,000 rounds of ammunition and large quantities of brandy, tea and Turkish delight and set out for Lhasa, but did not reach its goal.
1879–1880 via Hami and through the Qaidam Basin to Qinghai Lake. The expedition then crossed the Tian Shan into Tibet, proceeding to within  of Lhasa before being turned back by Tibetan officials.
1883–1885 from Kyakhta across the Gobi to Alashan and the eastern Tian Shan mountains, turning back at the Yangze. The expedition then returned to Qinghai Lake and moved westwards to Hotan and Issyk Kul.

The results of these expanded journeys opened a new era for the study of Central Asian geography as well as studies of the fauna and flora of this immense region that were relatively unknown to his Western contemporaries. Among other things, he described Przewalski's horse and Przewalski's gazelle, which were both named after him. He also described what was then considered to be a wild population of Bactrian camel. In the 21st century, the Wild Bactrian camel was shown to be a separate species from the domestic Bactrian camel. Przhevalsky's writings include five major books written in Russian and two English translations: Mongolia, the Tangut Country, and the Solitudes of Northern Tibet  (1875) and From Kulja, Across the Tian Shan to Lob-Nor (1879). The Royal Geographical Society awarded him their Founder's Medal in 1879 for his work.

Przhevalsky died of typhus not long before the beginning of his fifth journey, at Karakol on the shore of Issyk Kul in present-day Kyrgyzstan. He contracted typhoid from the Chu River, which was acknowledged as being infected with the disease. The Tsar immediately changed the name of the town to Przhevalsk. There are monuments to him, and a museum about his life and work, there and another monument in St. Petersburg.

Less than a year after his premature death, Mikhail Pevtsov succeeded Przhevalsky at the head of his expedition into the depths of Central Asia. Przhevalsky's work was also continued by his young disciple Pyotr Kozlov.

There is another place named after Przhevalsky: he had lived in a small village called Sloboda, Smolensk Oblast, Russia from 1881-7 (except the period of his travels) and he apparently loved it. The village was renamed after him in 1964 and is now called Przhevalskoye. There is a memorial complex there that includes the old and new houses of Nikolay Przhevalsky, his bust, pond, garden, birch alleys, and khatka (a lodge, watch-house). This is the only museum of the famous traveler in Russia.

Przhevalsky is commemorated by Maxim. in the naming of Przewalskia , a genus of flowering plants from Asia, belonging to the family Solanaceae.

His name is eponymic with more than 80 plant species as well.

Przhevalsky is honored in the scientific names of five species of lizards: Alsophylax przewalskii, Eremias przewalskii, Phrynocephalus przewalskii, Scincella przewalskii, and Teratoscincus przewalskii.

Accusations of imperialism and prejudice
According to David Schimmelpenninck Van Der Oye's assessment, Przhevalsky's books on Central Asia feature his disdain for the "Oriental"— particularly Chinese civilization. Przhevalsky explicitly portrayed Chinese people as cowardly, dirty and lazy in his metaphor, "the blend of a mean Moscow pilferer and a kike", in all respects inferior to Western culture. He purportedly argued that imperial China's hold on its northern territories, in particular Xinjiang and Mongolia, was tenuous and uncertain, and Przhevalsky openly called for Russia's annexation of bits and pieces of China's territory. Przhevalsky said one should explore Asia "with a carbine in one hand, a whip in the other."

Przhevalsky, as well as other contemporary explorers including Sven Hedin, Francis Younghusband, and Aurel Stein, were active players in the British–Russian struggle for influence in Central Asia, the so-called Great Game.

Przhevalsky's prejudice extended to non-Chinese Asians as well, describing the Tajik Yaqub Beg in a letter as follows, "Yakub Beg is the same shit as all feckless Asiatics. The Kashgarian empire isn't worth a kopek." Przhevalsky also claimed Yaqub was "Nothing more than a political impostor," and also disdained the Muslim subjects of Yaqub Beg in Kashgar, claiming that they "constantly cursed their government and expressed their desire to become Russian subjects. [...] The savage Asiatic clearly understands Russian power is the guarantee for prosperity." These statements were made in a report in which Przhevalsky recommended that Russian troops occupy the Kashgarian emirate, but the Russian government took no action, and China recaptured Kashgar. Przhevalsky's dreams of taking land from China did not materialize.

Przhevalsky not only disdained Chinese ethnic groups, he also viewed the eight million non-Chinese peoples of Tibet, Turkestan, and Mongolia as uncivilized, evolutionarily backwards people who needed to be freed from Chinese rule. Przhevalsky reportedly killed a number of Tibetan nomads.

Przhevalsky proposed Russia provoke rebellions of the Buddhist and Muslim peoples in these areas of China against the Chinese regime, start a war with China, and, with a small number of Russian troops, wrest control of Turkestan from China.

Personal life
Przhevalsky is known to have had a personal relationship with Tasya Nuromskaya, whom he met in Smolensk. According to one legend, during their last meeting Nuromskaya cut off her braid and gave it to him, saying that the braid would travel with him until their marriage. She died of a sunstroke while Przhevalsky was on an expedition.

Another woman in Przhevalsky's life was a mysterious young lady whose portrait, along with a fragment of poetry, was found in Przhevalsky's album. In the poem, she asks him to stay with her and not to go to Tibet, to which he responded in his diary: "I will never betray the ideal, to which is dedicated all of my life. As soon as I write everything necessary, I will return to the desert...where I will be much happier than in the gilded salons that can be acquired by marriage".

Myth
There is an urban legend that Joseph Stalin was an illegitimate son of Nikolay Przhevalsky. The legend is based on the facial similarity of both men, Stalin's official birthdate controversy (claims that he was born on 6 December 1878 instead of 21 December 1879,) and that the late Stalin era saw a resurrection of interest to the personality of Przhevalsky, numerous books and monographs were published in the Soviet Union and satellite Communist countries (which was a rare occurrence in regard to the Tsarist-era scientists,) Soviet encyclopedias portrayed Przhevalsky in sharp similarity to Stalin, which was rumored that in such a discreet manner Stalin was paying a homage to his alleged biological father. M. Khachaturova, a Tbilisi resident, who happened to know an unnamed old lady, the original bearer of the secret, was considered to be a whistleblower of the myth about Stalin's mother's alleged promiscuity. Przhevalsky's diary, if it ever existed, was rumored to disappear from archives during the early days of Stalin's ascent to power as the Communist party career, especially in its highest echelon, was troublesome for the noble blood people, who claimed a hoi polloi origin. There were unsubstantiated claims that certain 1881 paycheck ledger contained brief notes on money transfer from Przhevalsky to Stalin's mother. However, Przhevalsky's visits to Georgia are not recorded, and G. Egnatashvili, a family friend of the Jughashvilis, did not recollect anything which could possibly substantiate those claims. During the Stalin era any talk concerning his ancestry and childhood was a public taboo, but the ferocity, with which the legend was debunked after the Stalin's death with the entire monographs written in order to disprove the myth (up until the 2010s,) also was considered by some as a further proof of veracity of the Przhevalsky's alleged one-night-stand theory. A humorously developed version of this legend appears in The Life and Extraordinary Adventures of Private Ivan Chonkin (Book Three) by Vladimir Voinovich.

Works

Film
 A 1951 Soviet drama film is dedicated to Przhevalsky's life and work.

Notes

References

Further reading

 "Sketch of Nicholas Prejevalski" in Popular Science Monthly, Volume 30, January, 1887

External links 

 Kyrill Kunakhovich, "Nikolai Mikhailovich Przhevalsky and the Politics of Russian Imperialism", in "IDP News", Issue No. 27 (accessed 2007-01-31)

1839 births
1888 deaths
People from Pochinkovsky District, Smolensk Oblast
People from Smolensky Uyezd
People from the Russian Empire of Polish descent
Explorers from the Russian Empire
Geographers from the Russian Empire
Russian geographers
Russian biologists
Explorers of Asia
Explorers of Tibet
Explorers of Central Asia
Russian mountain climbers
Military personnel of the Russian Empire
Honorary members of the Saint Petersburg Academy of Sciences
Zoological collectors
Deaths from typhus